Al-jāmi'a meaning "the Inclusive" is a book that Twelver Shias believe was dictated by Muhammad to Ali. 
Ja'far al-Sadiq refers to it as a scroll (ṣaḥīfa) that is 70 cubits long and was dictated by the Prophet Muhammad and written down by Ali. It is also known as Kitab Ali (lit. Book of Ali) in some sources. It is said that it covers all legal questions, including such details as the blood-money due for a scratch.
 like Al-Jafr.

Description
Al-Jamia is a scroll made from rams skin which measures 70 cubits long (as measured by the arm of Muhammad) and the width of a sheepskin.

It is believed that the al-Jami'a never ages and that nothing written therein can be erased ("darasa"). And that because Imams have it, they are significantly more knowledgeable about the law than any other experts. Abd Allah ibn Shubruma, a jurist from Kufa who died in 144/761 [*I'm wild-guessing that 144 means 144 anno Hijra and 761 is 761 common era--feel free to correct me*], is thus disparaged by Ja'far al-Sadiq. Similar to this, Ja'far al-Sadiq claims that Abd Allah ibn Al-Hasan, a leader of the rival Shi'i Hasanid branch, only has access to the texts that are available to the rest of the community; he lacks the additional texts that the Imams possess and will not be able to respond to legal questions as a result. There is no need for analogic reasoning (qiys) therefore, according to Shia imams, because the jami'a already has all of the answers. Ja'far al-Sadiq is said to have buried the book when the extremist Shi'i al-Mughīra ibn Sa'īd was crucified in 119/73736 [*I'm also wild-guessing that 119 means 119 anno Hijra and 73736 is likely a typo for means 736 common era--again feel free to correct me*] on the orders of the Umayyad governor Khalid al-Qasri, an event that al-Sadiq must have perceived as posing a threat to other Shi'is as well. The book, thus, was well guarded against enemies.
The Twelver Shia believe that Al-Jamia is currently in the possession of the 12th Imam Muhammad al-Mahdi, after he inherited it from his predecessors.

Contents
The contents of al-Jamia include:
Details and showing of all the permitted (halal) and sinful things (haraam).
Legal verdicts.

See also
Al-Sahifa al-Sajjadiyya
Book of Ali
Book of Fatimah
Mushaf
Nahj al-Balagha

References

External links
Kitab Al-Kafi, Chapter 40 (Statements about al-Jafr, al-Jami‘ and the Book of Fatima (a.s.)), translated by Muhammad Sarwar

Islamic texts
Shia literature